Alessandro Emanuele "Alex" Treves (January 14, 1929 – December 12, 2020) was an Italian-born American Olympic fencer. Treves was born in Torino, Italy, and is Jewish. He later lived in New York City.

Career
Treves fenced for Salle Santelli. He fenced for Rutgers University (class of 1950), and won the National Collegiate Athletic Association (NCAA) saber title in both 1949 and 1950. Treves was undefeated in three years of competing in college. He competed for the United States at the 1950 Maccabiah Games.

Treves competed for the United States in the team sabre event at the 1952 Summer Olympics in Helsinki, and the team came in fourth. He won three Amateur Fencers League of America (AFLA) National Championships in team sabre; in 1952, 1955, and 1956. In 1953, Treves won the World Military Sabre Championship, and in 1954 he won the Italian University Sabre Championship. In 2000, Treves was elected to the Rutgers Sports Hall of Fame.

References

External links
 

1929 births
2020 deaths
American male sabre fencers
Competitors at the 1950 Maccabiah Games
Maccabiah Games competitors for the United States
Maccabiah Games fencers
Olympic fencers of the United States
Fencers at the 1952 Summer Olympics
Sportspeople from New York City
Sportspeople from Turin
Jewish male sabre fencers
Jewish American sportspeople
Italian emigrants to the United States
20th-century Italian Jews
Rutgers University alumni
21st-century American Jews